Moses Osei Kwarteng better known as Moses OK, is a Ghanaian Gospel musician, songwriter and an author.

Awards and nominations 
Moses OK was nominated for best male vocal performance and New gospel artist of the year 2013.

References 

Living people
21st-century Ghanaian male singers
21st-century Ghanaian singers
Ghanaian gospel singers
Year of birth missing (living people)